College football in Ireland began initially in 1988 as part of a promotional campaign to mark the Dublin millennium celebrations. Dubbed the Emerald Isle Classic, it was the first NCAA-sanctioned American college football game played in Europe. The game was played at Lansdowne Road in Dublin, Ireland in the years 1988 and 1989.

The event was first proposed and arranged by Aidan J. Prendergast and Jim O'Brien. Prendergast, who was a former president of the Irish American Football Association conceived the idea of bringing a major NCAA game to Ireland in the mid-1980s and started pitching the idea on both sides of the Atlantic. Prendergast promoted both the 1988 and 1989 games.

The game was intended as an annual event to attract some of the 40 million Americans of Irish descent back to Ireland. College teams with particularly Irish or Catholic background were chosen in an effort to attract Irish nationals to the games.

1988
The inaugural Emerald Isle Classic was held at Lansdowne Road with a crowd of 42,524 in attendance. It featured a 2–7 Boston College team led by Mark Kamphaus  beat the 8–1 Army Black Knights 38–24.

1996
In 1996, Notre Dame and the United States Naval Academy began a second American football event in Ireland called the Shamrock Classic. The event, played at Croke Park, drew a slightly smaller crowd than the first Emerald Isle Classic. Notre Dame won the game over Navy, setting the record for the longest winning streak over an annual collegiate opponent at 33 wins (Notre Dame added 10 additional wins to the streak, which remains the all-time record at 43 consecutive victories).

2012
A return trip by the teams in 2012, held at Aviva Stadium, was confirmed by the two schools and stadium management in September 2010. The Emerald Isle Classic was tied to the Irish tourism initiative The Gathering, which sought to encourage members of the Irish diaspora (especially in the U.S.) to visit their ancestral home in 2013. The first advance sellout for a sporting event in the two-year history of Aviva Stadium, 15,000 tickets sold in less than two hours, and about 35,000 Americans went to Dublin. The 2012 game aired live in parts of Europe as well as the U.S. The U.S. Navy docked an amphibious-assault warship in Dublin before the game. While the event was successful from a tourism perspective, it was marred by the poor treatment of the sport locally by the game organisers. Consequently, the originators, who had allowed the name "Emerald Isle Classic" to be used in 2012, transferred the intellectual property relating to the event, including the trademarks for the event name to the Irish American Football Association in 2015 for 'safe keeping'.

2014
In June 2013, Penn State and UCF were reportedly in negotiations to play their 2014 season opener at Aviva, and the stadium was also seen as a potential venue for a proposed bowl game that would begin that season. The Orlando Sentinel, located in UCF's home city, reported in July 2013 that the teams would play the game at Croke Park instead of Aviva. That month the game, to be called the Croke Park Classic, was confirmed. The Croke Park Classic saw the University of Central Florida (UCF) host Penn State in their 2014 Season Opener in GAA HQ on 30 August 2014. This was the first time UCF and Penn State had played outside the United States and Penn State took the Dan Rooney Trophy in a competitively fought game. 53,304 fans attended the thrilling encounter in which Penn State defeated UCF with a Sam Ficken field goal in the dying seconds, by a final score of 26 to 24. The Irish American Football Association was one of the official partners in the game and provided both promotional and technical assistance to Croke Park.

2016
On 4 June 2015, Irish American Events Limited (IAEL), which is a joint venture between Corporate.ie and Anthony Travel, announced that American college football would return to Ireland in 2016 with a match-up between Boston College and Georgia Tech. The game was played at Aviva Stadium on 3 September 2016, and billed as the Aer Lingus College Football Classic.

The announcement was made at the reception in Dublin attended by the Taoiseach Enda Kenny TD, which was followed by a reception in Boston College in the U.S. attended by the mayor of Boston, Marty Walsh.

Aer Lingus was announced as the title sponsor for the game, with Tourism Ireland, Failte Ireland and the Dublin City Council also lending support.

The game attracted 40,562 spectators and resulted in a 17–14 victory for Georgia Tech.

2020 
University of Notre Dame announced on 25 October 2018, that the Fighting Irish would return to Dublin to face Navy Midshipmen at Aviva Stadium on 29 August 2020. On 2 June 2020, it was announced that due to the COVID-19 pandemic, the game would not be played in Dublin and would instead be played at Navy-Marine Corps Memorial Stadium in Annapolis, Maryland. The game would eventually not be played after Notre Dame elected to play an all-ACC schedule for the 2020 season, and the conference disallowed most games outside the conference to maintain the same screening standards for each game.

2022 
University of Nebraska-Lincoln announced on 14 October 2019, that the Nebraska Cornhuskers would travel to Dublin to face the Illinois Fighting Illini at Aviva Stadium on 28 August 2021.

On 17 February 2021, it was announced that the game would once again not be played in Dublin due to the COVID-19 pandemic, and instead be played at Memorial Stadium in Champaign, Illinois, on 28 August 2021.  The game was ultimately postponed to the 2022 season, where it was played on 27 August 2022 against the Northwestern Wildcats instead of Illinois where Northwestern won the game 31–28 against Nebraska.

Results

Future games

References

External links
 2020 Aer Lingus College Football Classic 

American football in Ireland
College football bowls
Army Black Knights football
Boston College Eagles football
Navy Midshipmen football
Notre Dame Fighting Irish football
Pittsburgh Panthers football
Sports competitions in Dublin (city)
Gaelic games controversies